Missing Andy is a British mod-influenced band based in Essex. The group comprises Alex Greaves, Jonathan Sharpe, Rob Jones, Steve Rolls, and Elliot Richardson. The band's debut single "The Way We're Made (Made In England)" reached number 38 on the UK Singles Chart and number 7 on the UK Indie Chart in September 2010, after their status was confirmed as runners-up in Sky1's television talent competition, Must Be The Music. Their debut digital only single "The Greatest Show On Earth - Act I" was released on 4 October 2010, with four tracks. It is said to be part of a compilation of an unspecified number of singles. Missing Andy have released three studio albums (Generation Silenced, Guerrilla Invasion Pt. 1 and Guerrilla Invasion Pt. 2).

History

2008–11: Early years

Missing Andy were good friends when they formed to make a band in 2008. They played in local pubs and clubs in Essex, and gained some popularity on the internet, both through Facebook popularity, and on YouTube.

2011–2012: Must Be the Music and album
The band auditioned for Must Be the Music in the summer of 2010, wowing the crowd at their first audition. They got through to the semi-finals by decision of the judges, and thanks to the public phone votes they reached the final, ultimately reaching the final three. Missing Andy lost out to Emma's Imagination, who won the competition outright, making Missing Andy runners-up along with five piece band The Pictures. In October 2010 band released the first part of a download-only digital single series containing four tracks and in October 2011, they released their debut full album Generation Silenced as a download-only digital format.

Having reflected upon being on the show, the band have since said of the positive and negative qualities of it with Greaves saying, "The TV show kind of damaged us a bit, but good things have come of it,"

2012–present: Acoustic EP and Guerrilla Invasion
In 2012, Missing Andy began work on a follow-up to Generation Silenced. In January 2013, the band released an Acoustic EP showcasing acoustic versions of new songs that would feature on their new album. The EP consisted of four songs: "It's Over", "Young Disciple", "Mr. Policeman" and "Slip Away", all acoustic versions. The EP gained positive reviews and charted highly in the iTunes rock chart.

The band announced via the Internet that their second album is to be called Guerrilla Invasion and the first single taken from it would be "Feel Like This". A video for "Feel Like This" was released on YouTube on 23 February. The single was released on 11 March 2013, and the album Guerrilla Invasion was released on 1 April 2013 in two parts. Missing Andy announced via their Twitter page on 29 January, that they would hold an album launch party for Guerrilla Invasion at London's KOKO on 29 March 2013. Attendees would be able to hear the brand new songs before release and could purchase the album and new merchandise before the album was released.

In support of the double-album, Missing Andy embarked on their Guerrilla Invasion Tour. The tour featured dates around the UK including dates in Manchester, Liverpool, Glasgow and Birmingham. The tour started in March 2013 (at London's KOKO) and ran through the summer until October 2013.

Members
Alex Greaves - vocals
Jonathan Sharpe - synth/keyboards
Rob Jones - bass, backing vocals
Elliot Richardson - drums, piano
Steve Greenwood - Guitar

Former members
 Peter Brooker - synth/keyboards
Gareth Babet - synth/keyboards
Steve Rolls - guitar, backing vocals

Discography

Albums

Singles

References

British indie rock groups
Post-Britpop groups
Musical groups from Essex